Pete Herman (February 12, 1896 – April 13, 1973) was one of the all-time great bantamweight world champions. An American of Italian heritage and descent, Herman was born Peter Gulotta in New Orleans, Louisiana, and fought from 1912 until 1927. He retired with a record of 69 wins (19 by KO), 11 losses, 8 draws and 61 no-decisions in 149 bouts. His managers were Jerome Gargano, Doc Cutch, Sammy Goldman and Red Walsh. Nat Fleisher, Ring Magazine editor and founder, impressively rated Herman as the #2 best all time bantamweight.

Early life and career
Herman was a smooth boxer and great body puncher. He was particularly skilled at inside fighting. He was born on February 12, 1896, in Convent, Louisiana, to a family of Italian descent. Making an early start, he fought his first pro fight around 1912 at the age of only 16. According to boxing lore, Herman earned some of his living as a "bootblack" or shoe shine before making it as a boxer. Two years after his first bout, he held his own during a 10-round, no-decision bout against World bantamweight champion Kid Williams on June 20, 1914, at the Pelican Stadium in New Orleans, though losing the bout in the opinion of the local Times-Picayune.

Herman defeated San Franciscan Eddie Campi on September 13, 1914, in a twenty-round points decision in New Orleans.

In his first eighteen bouts, between September 1912, and July 1913, his only losses were to a single boxer, Johnny Fisse on points on five separate occasions. He would draw with Fisse on September 29, 1913, in Memphis, Tennessee, making Fisse his most frequent career opponent.

Bouts with Eddie Coulon
On December 13, 1915, Herman defeated fellow New Orleans boxer Eddie Coulon in a fourth-round knockout in New Orleans. Both boxers weighed 116 pounds, but Coulon had a -inch reach advantage. Herman had faced Coulon twice in his early career on September 30, and October 21, 1912, in two six-round draws in New Orleans. He would defeat to Coulon on September 1, 1913, in Memphis, Tennessee, in an eight-round points decision.

Herman lost to the great New York Jewish boxer Lew Tendler on February 28, 1916, at the Olympia Club in Philadelphia in a six-round newspaper decision. Tendler would later meet the greatest boxers of his era including the lightweight champion Benny Leonard in several bouts.

On June 12, 1916, he defeated Frankie Brown, New York bantamweight, in New Orleans in a fifteen-round points decision. He had drawn with Brown three months earlier in Baltimore in another fifteen round bout.

World Bantamweight Champion, 1917

In their fourth meeting, Herman finally won the title from Kid Williams on January 9, 1917, in a twenty-round points decision in New Orleans, even though Williams was allowed to pick his own referee for the match, Bill Rocap. Herman scored knockdowns in the fifth and twelfth. Though Williams was the aggressor throughout the fight, Herman had little trouble dodging the former champion's blows. Due to Williams' aggressive style of boxing in the bout, many ringside believed he had won more of the rounds than Herman.

Knocking out Johnny Coulon, May 1917
On May 14, 1917, Herman defeated Johnny Coulon in a third-round technical knockout at Lakeside Auditorium in Racine, Wisconsin. Halfway through the third, Coulon was down for a count of nine from a right swing to the jaw by Herman, not long after coming out of a clinch. After Coulon rose, the referee stopped the fight, as Coulon still seemed woozy. Herman had a nine-pound weight advantage, and a two-inch reach advantage. Coulon was seven years older at twenty-eight, which may have made a difference in the fight. Coulon had formerly held and lost the World Bantamweight Title.

Fighting as Bantamweight Championship

Marriage to Annie LeBlanc, November 1917
On the evening of November 4, 1917, Herman was married to Annie LeBlanc, whom he had known since he was a child in New Orleans. The following day Herman defeated Frankie Burns in a twenty-round points decision at Louisiana Auditorium in New Orleans in what a few sources considered a title bout. Herman was scheduled to have reported for service in the US Army after the bout. Herman did not have great difficulty amassing enough points to win the bout. Burns had a difficult time in the first three rounds and was staggered by Herman in the second. Burns may have evened the fighting in the seventeenth round. Herman had previously suffered a thirteenth-round technical knockout from burns in November 1914 in the same city. Herman did not box from late December until May 1918, and may have been in military training. In March 1918, the US Navy refused Herman furloughs to box until he had achieved three months of active duty.

On December 14, 1917, Herman won with a third-round technical knockout against Frankie Mason, in Fort Wayne, Indiana. In the second round, Mason was knocked to the canvas for the first time in his career.

On May 23, 1919, he defeated Johnny "Kewpie" Ertle in Minneapolis, Minnesota, in a fifth-round technical knockout. The deciding blow was a strong left to the jaw. Ertle had previously been down for a count of eight in the fourth, but was saved by the bell.

He defeated Chicago bantamweight Johnny Ritchie on January 7, 1920, in an eighth-round technical knockout at Tulane Stadium in New Orleans. After a knockdown in the eighth, Ritchie arose still staggering, and the fight was stopped by the referee. Herman had won the bout with ease.

Loss of Bantamweight Championship, 1920
In the late evening of December 22, 1920, Herman lost his bantamweight title in Madison Square Garden to Joe Lynch in a fifteen-round unanimous decision. In a decisive bout, the El Paso Herald gave Lynch ten rounds with four for Herman. Lynch used to advantage his superior height and a four-inch advantage in reach. Only a day after the bout, Herman sailed for London to face Jimmy Wilde.

Bout with Jimmy Wilde, 1921
Herman's most memorable match was fought against Jimmy Wilde, the legendary Welsh Flyweight World Champion.

The Wilde-Herman fight was staged on January 13, 1921, at Royal Albert Hall in London, and resulted in a seventeenth-round technical knockout for Herman. The former bantamweight champion used his weight advantage and body punching to wear down Wilde, the still reigning Flyweight champ. Herman hurt Wilde in the 15th when the fighting was fierce against the ropes, and knocked him through the ropes three times in the 17th round to end the fight. The classy Wilde made no excuses. He stated after the fight "I can sincerely say that Herman beat me because he was the better boxer." Many gave Wilde the first five rounds, but Herman came back particularly strong in the fifteenth, until he ended the bout in the seventeenth.  The exciting match brought an impressive crowd of around 10,000, including the Prince of Wales.

On July 11, 1921, Herman defeated British Bantamweight Champion Jim Higgins in an eleventh-round knockout at the Highland Park Ring in London. Herman won every round but the eighth, when Higgins delivered a blow to the chin of Herman. Herman took the match with a right hook to the jaw of Higgins, after which, according to one source, Higgins was down for a full five minutes. Most of the bout was described as in-fighting.

Regaining Bantamweight Title, 1921

On July 25, 1921, Herman fought Joe Lynch in a rematch for the World bantamweight title in New York's storied Ebbets Field. Both boxers weighed in at  pounds. The Scranton Republican and other sources gave Herman 13 of the 15 rounds, with only the eleventh to Lynch and the second even. Herman's decisive win on points fueled speculation that he had thrown the first fight.  Herman forced the fighting, taking the lead from the opening bell using both left and right effectively. At the time, Herman was one of the few fighters ever to regain a lost title.

On September 5, 1921, Herman defeated French boxer Charles LeDoux at Louisiana Stadium in New Orleans in a tenth-round newspaper decision. According to more than one source, Herman had a shade better of the no-decision bout, particularly among the local sportswriters.

Loss of second Bantamweight Title, 1921
He lost the World Bantamweight Championship for the second time on September 23, 1921, when he was outpointed by Johnny Buff in a fifteen-round title match at Madison Square Garden. Buff took ten rounds employing lightning speed, with only four rounds for his opponent. Herman put Buff on the canvas only once very briefly in the fourth round with a right to the jaw. For most of the bout, Herman had trouble using his often powerful right effectively. By the fifteenth round Buff was able to freely reign most of his blows on Herman. Having a very slight advantage in reach, and a four-pound weight disadvantage, Buff won on points by a sizable margin. Buff was fighting at nearly thirty while Herman was only 25. Buff had taken the American Flyweight Championship previously.

Losing vision, December 1921
Herman had begun losing sight in one eye, and he claimed to have been nearly blind in that eye by April 1921, well before he fought Buff. He fought five more times, knocking out number one contender Packy O'Gatty in one round at the Rink Sporting Club in Brooklyn, on December 9, 1921.  O'Gatty went down two minutes and fourteen seconds into the first round from an overhand right to the jaw. Herman had previously landed a strong right uppercut to the jaw of O'Gatty that had rattled him earlier in the round. The crowd at the Rink Club in Brooklyn was not large, filling only about half the seats.  Herman claimed after the bout he hoped to get a title match again with Johnny Buff, but that Buff would not consent to meet him. Considering Herman's impending loss of vision, his retirement was probably a wise choice.

Herman retired in 1922 after winning a ten-round bout on points with Roy Moore in Boston on April 24.

Life after boxing
According to one source, Herman's investments were made wisely on the advice of a friend, B. S. D'Antoni, though Herman retired before the great depression. His earnings in 1921 were estimated at $200,000.

He eventually became completely blind. After his retirement from the ring, he owned and operated a club in the New Orleans French Quarter. Pete Herman's was a popular New Orleans landmark. He was appointed to an honorary position with the New Orleans Boxing Commission in the 1920s.  He appeared as himself in one movie, New Orleans Uncensored.

On April 13, 1973, Herman died in a New Orleans hospital after failing health and a fall that broke his hip the previous month. Funeral services were held on April 16.

Herman was elected into the Boxing Hall of Fame in 1959. He was inducted into the International Boxing Hall of Fame in 1997. He was also a member of the Louisiana and New Orleans Sports Hall of Fame.

Professional boxing record
All information in this section is derived from BoxRec, unless otherwise stated.

Official record

All newspaper decisions are officially regarded as “no decision” bouts and are not counted in the win/loss/draw column.

Unofficial record

Record with the inclusion of newspaper decisions in the win/loss/draw column.

f

See also
List of bantamweight boxing champions

References

External links
 
 Pete Herman – Cyber Boxing Zone

1896 births
1973 deaths
American people of Italian descent
Bantamweight boxers
World bantamweight boxing champions
International Boxing Hall of Fame inductees
Boxers from Louisiana
Sportspeople from New Orleans
American male boxers
Shoeshiners